Soup and Bouilli in England is a dish of boiled beef and root vegetables based on the traditional French dish pot-au-feu. The name comes from the general method in France of serving pot-au-feu as two courses - la soupe et le bouilli.  In England as in France bouilli referred to the boiled meat.

History

Early references to Soup and Bouilli in English are from books by Tobias Smollett.  In The Adventures of Roderick Random published in  1748, a meal in Rheims, France, is described  as  "some soup and bouillé, a couple of pullets roasted, and a dish of asparagus"., and in The Adventures of Ferdinand, Count Fathom, at Hotwells Spa,  "a mess of broth" made with mutton chops is referred to as "soup and bouilli".

In 1778 in The Camp (play), by Richard  Sheridan, a waiter at an Inn in Maidstone, Kent, proposes "soup and bouilli" as an entree.

A recipe for Soup and Boullie was included in The Ladies Assistant by Charlotte Mason in 1773,with the spelling changed to Soup and Bouillie in later editions, and another dish called Bouillie Beef was in  The Experienced English Housekeeper by Elizabeth Raffald in 1778.  In both recipes the soup and the meat were  served as separate dishes.

These recipes were soon copied into other books. With acknowledgements to Mason and Farrald, Mary Cole's The Ladies Complete Guide of 1788 includes both recipes and Bouillie Beef appears in John Farley's, "The London Art of Cookery" from 1783 and Soup and Bouillie is in the 1789<ref>[https://archive.org/details/b2152967x  The London Art of Cookery,John Farley, 6th Edition]</ref> and later editions. The Cook's Oracle by William Kitchiner contained versions of both dishes.

The dish would remain on the menu throughout the 19th Century. Alexis Soyer in 1846 extolled its excellence and George Augustus Sala, could write in 1856, in a fictional piece, that it was at a restaurant in Paris, in the soup and bully, the Bourgeoise Bouillon Boeuf, that he found "true beef".

Soup and Bully

Naming her recipe  'Soup and Boullie', Charlotte Mason in 1773 was possibly reflecting the pronunciation of 'bouilli' in England at the time.

Still earlier in 1753   'bully'  was being used especially by those who were ignorant of French manners and customs and disparaged the dish as overcooked and tasteless. In that year in an article by  Arthur Murphy (writer), George Briton,  a  condescending Englishman in Paris, wrote " I could by no means  live upon their soup and bully", and in "The Adventures of Ferdinand Count Fathom", Sir Stentor Stile, a rich buffoon knight abroad in Paris, complained that he "could get no eatables upon the ruoad, but what they called bully, which looks like the flesh of Pharaoh's lean kine stewed into rags and tatters"

Although Briton and Stiles were being held up to ridicule this view was supported in 1825 by French gastronome Jean Anthelme Brillat-Savarin who wrote that Bouilli is flesh minus  its juice...and has disappeared from truly fashionable dinners (Le bouilli est de la chair moins son jus...et a disparu dans les dîners véritablement soignés)".

In 1838 Dudley Costello's  coach driver on an excursion to Antwerp and being served little square slices of bouilli explains to his friends  "bully means beef with the strength b'iled out on it" and in 1870 a London newspaper, in an article comparing the consumption of meat in England and France, could still write "the poorest englishman esteems "bully beef" as being fit only for the pigs".

However, the dish had its supporters in England, but in some circles to call it 'bully beef' was a "barbarism" and in 1829 Sydney, Lady Morgan would write of her shame and horror when, entertaining "English epicures", an old friend also at the table, amongst other gaffes, called bouilli,  "bully beef"

Preserved Soup and Bouilli

The commercial canning of food began in England in 1812. The company was  Donkin, Hall and Gamble and amongst their first products were canisters of Soup and Bouilli.

By 1813 they were supplying the Royal Navy and in 1814 Vice Admiral Sir Alexander Cochrane recommended that "the Patent Prepared Meats and Soups......., especially the Soup and Bouilli :.....be sent out  here [Bermuda]  for the sick on board ships of the squadron", beginning the practice of serving soup and bouilli to the sick and convalescents.

Over the next century preserved Soup and Bouilli in tin canisters would be produced by many manufacturers and  become a staple on long sea voyages for crews and passengers. In 1910 it was still the "most used soup".

Scale of Medicines

From 1835 merchant ships sailing from the United Kingdom were required to keep on board a Supply of Medicines and from 1845 these were itemised in a schedule, The Scale of Medicines. This became The Scale of Medicines and Medical Stores in the Merchant Shipping Act 1867 and from 1 January 1868 Preserved Soup and Bouilli was included, even though Thomas Spencer Wells had noted in the 1861 edition that "the soup and bouilli for the emigrant ships ...is the very worst kind of provisions that could be selected, as ...the captain does not know how much meat he is supplying to his men or passengers".

There also had been an earlier proposal by Christopher Biden in 1849 to add to the Merchant Shipping Act a requirement for ships to carry a Scale of Provisions  which included Soup and Bouilli.

Soap and Bullion
As noted above  it was not only the amount of  ingredients that could vary but also the quality  as revealed in 1852 in the Goldners Meats scandal which resulted in some seamen retaining "an invincible prejudice against preserved meats" from the time when " much of the meat was no better than carrion or the vilest offal"

On long sea voyages passengers too developed an antipathy to the dish. It was seen as one of the "ills appertaining to cheap voyaging" and was pitched overboard from the sailing vessel Norman Morison going from London to Vancouver in 1849–50. In theatres and music halls in Australia in 1860  the mention of Soup and Bouilli would raise a laugh from what would have been a mainly immigrant audience. It would still amuse one old colonist in 1912

William Clark Russell who spent many years in the merchant navy wrote of its 'disgusting flavour' and that "canned meat or tins of soup and bouilli... purchased in the cheapest markets may produce distempers more terrible than the scurvy they are supposed to combat". It was the "most disgusting of the provisions served out to the merchant sailor" and referred to by sailors as soap and bullion

Soup and Bouilli Tins

Once emptied the tin canisters that were used to preserve Soup and Bouilli and other provisions still had a value. In 1828  "70 Empty preserved meat canisters" were  advertised for sale.  On one emigrant ship a tinman was "kept quite busy making into useful cases our empty soup and bouilli cans". They had a practical value as cooking pots, paint pots, eating bowls, drinking cups, to bail leaky boats, as a pot for plants etc.  and by the 1850's, 'soup and bouilli tin' or 'bouilli tin' had entered the lexicon as  a generic term for these used containers, especially with  sailors, ships passengers and emigrants who had spent time at sea where soup and bouilli was familiar fare.  Some examples being:

On an arctic expedition in search of Sir John Franklin a bouilli tin was used to make a spirit lamp.
Neptunes crown, in a crossing the line ritual, was a notched soup and bouilli tin decorated with flags stars and mermaids.
Henry Morton Stanley reported to the Royal Geographical Society that at Suna [Tanzania] he offered the 'gentlemen' there empty soup and bouilli tins, amongst other worthless items, as tokens of friendship.
A soup and bouilli tin became a drum in a makeshift orchestra of kitchen utensils.
A soup and bouilli tin proposed for a Coat of Arms for patrons of soup kitchens with the motto That's the ticket for soup,.The Slang Dictionary, J. C. Hotten, 1875
A collection was taken up in a soup and bouilli tinSoup and bouilli tin was also employed figuratively. When used metaphorically it alluded to a rough and ready or no-frills construction or operation.
A  boat is launched by pitching it overboard  like an empty bouilli tin.

A boat is as (water)tight as a soup and bouilli tin
A life-buoy rescue signal, in size and shape is "not unlike a 8lb soup and bouilli tin (so familiar to all immigrants)"
 A ship repairer  "has a soup-and-bouilli-can arrangement on the dock side" as a workshop.
 The description of a rival invention as a "soup and bouilli-tin gasometer and condenser".
 As a vessel for "savoury" news and a pun on "bulletin" The Durham Bouilli-Tin'' was a shipboard newspaper.

The expression was used by poets and novelists - possibly to add or support a maritime association.
John Masefield's Dauber "mixed red lead in many a bouilli tin"
Rolf Boldrewood's island trader stores his money "in a large soup and bouilli tin in his [sea]chest."
Catherine Helen Spence marked the position of a waterhole in the Australian outback with an old soup-and-bouilli-tin, the contents possibly consumed on the Katherine Stewart Forbes (1818 ship).

References

English cuisine